Stewartia ovata, known commonly as mountain camellia, is a small tree native to low to mid-elevations in the southern Appalachian Mountains and nearby regions from Mississippi to Virginia. It is a member of the Theaceae, the tea family.

Although not endangered, the plant does have a limited range and is uncommon throughout its range. Mountain camellia grows in the understory of predominantly hardwood forests and tends to be found near streams, usually at elevations below .

Description
Stewartia ovata is a deciduous flowering shrub or small tree growing to 5 meters (16 2/3 feet) tall, with smooth, flaking grayish-orange bark. The flowers are camellia-like,  in diameter, with five white petals and numerous white, yellow or purple stamens; they appear in early to mid-summer.

Varieties
There are two varieties:
Stewartia ovata var. ovata — flowers 6–8 cm diameter, stamens white to yellow.
Stewartia ovata var. grandiflora (W.J.Bean) Weatherby — flowers up to 12 cm diameter, stamens purple.

References

 NatureServe profile: Stewartia ovata
 TreeTrail: Stewartia ovata—Mountain Camellia profile

External links

ovata
Endemic flora of the United States
Flora of the Southeastern United States
Natural history of the Great Smoky Mountains
Plants described in 1787
Taxa named by Antonio José Cavanilles